is a Japanese company that produces sewing machines, with manufacturing plants in Japan, Taiwan and Thailand.

History
The Pine Sewing Machine factory was founded on 16 October 1921. In 1935, the Janome trademark was established, and the company was renamed to Janome Sewing Machine Co., Ltd. in 1954. As one of many manufacturers selling in the USA, its subsidiary is Janome America located in Mahwah, New Jersey; and also owns Swiss brand Elna. The company manufactures all of its machines in the same factories.

Around 1862, William Barker and Andrew J. Clark began producing the "Pride of the West" machine, later calling it the "New England Single Thread Hand Sewing Machine" after moving the plant to Orange, Massachusetts, in 1867. Over the next few years, the New England machine and the "Home Shuttle" were their two most significant products. In 1882, the company reformed under the name New Home (a combination of the labels New England and Home Shuttle). The company ran into financial difficulties in the 1920s and was taken over by The Free Sewing Machine Company in 1930, after they temporarily ran the business for two years. In 1960, New Home and the "New Home" brand were purchased by the Janome company. Janome has led the way with innovation in sewing machines through establishing a research laboratory in Tokyo in 1964. Then in 1971 they released the first sewing machine with both programmable and computerised functions on the market.

Janome was the first to develop a computerized machine for home use (the Memory 7, in 1979), the first to offer professional style embroidery to the home market (the Memory Craft 8000, in 1990) and the first to offer a long-arm quilting machine for home use (the Memory Craft 6500P, in 2003).

On October 1, 2021, the company name was changed to "JANOME Corporation".

Name
The name "Janome" (蛇の目) literally means "snake's eye" and was taken from the appearance of the current bobbin design at the time of brand establishment in 1935 when the round bobbin system was the more advanced technology replacing the traditional long shuttle type. As the new round bobbin looked like a snake's eye, Janome was chosen as the company's name.

Janome is also the name of the traditional Japanese bull's-eye umbrella design.

Retail sales network

Janome is a globally recognized brand and has expanded into over 100 countries around the world. Distribution occurs through a retail sales channel, and information about where to purchase can be found through their global website. For a user, this means if you require parts, accessories or manuals, you also need to contact a retail distributor for any purchasing needs.

See also

 List of sewing machine brands

References

External links

 Janome Industrial Equipment

Manufacturing companies based in Tokyo
Manufacturing companies established in 1921
Japanese companies established in 1921
Japanese brands
Sewing machine brands
Companies listed on the Tokyo Stock Exchange